Alavaimalai()  is a hill in Vennandur block, Namakkal district, Tamil Nadu state, India.

Mythology 
The name Alavaimalai is derived from Tamil language. Alavaimalai: Arai-அரை+Vazhi-வழி+Malai-மலை. That is Arai-Half, Vazhi-Way, Malai-Hill. The Alavaimalai Subrayar Murugan Temple is located half of the hill  
and face to west side.

Geographic 
Alavaimalai is part of eastern ghats. Vennandur is located west from Alavaimalai. Athanur is located north from Alavaimalai. Vaiyappamalai is located south from Alavaimalai. And Rasipuram is located east from Alavaimalai.

Places
Forest Extension Center is located in Alavaimalai near District Major Road, Athanur.
Alavaimalai Subrayar Murugan Temple in Alavaimalai.
Sidhar Kovil in Alavaimalai near District Major Road

References

Eastern Ghats
Hills of Tamil Nadu
Namakkal district
Vennandur block